Dwight Jones Jr. (born January 1, 1989) is an American football wide receiver who is currently a free agent. He was signed by the Houston Texans as an undrafted free agent in 2012. He played college football for the North Carolina Tar Heels.

Early years
Jones attended Hugh M. Cummings High School in Burlington, North Carolina before transferring to Hargrave Military Academy in Chatham, Virginia. As a senior, he was a Parade All-American after he had 67 receptions for 1,396 yards and 12 touchdowns.

Jones was considered one of the top high school wide receiver recruits in 2008.

College career
Jones went on to play for The University of North Carolina and as a freshman in 2008, Jones played in three games but did not record a reception. As a sophomore in 2009, he played in seven games and had five receptions for 21 yards. As a junior in 2010, he started in 12 of 13 games and had 62 receptions for 946 yards with four touchdowns. He was named an honorable mention All-ACC. As a senior in 2011, he played in all 13 games and had 85 receptions for 1196 yards and twelve touchdowns.

Professional career

Houston Texans
After going undrafted in the 2012 NFL Draft, Jones was signed by the Houston Texans as an undrafted free agent. In May 2012, he informed the Texans of his decision to not pursue a professional football career. The team placed him on the reserve/did not report list shortly thereafter. He was released on June 12, 2013.

New York Jets
Jones was signed to the New York Jets' practice squad on December 18, 2013. He was released on May 19, 2014.

Arizona Rattlers
Jones was assigned to the Arizona Rattlers on October 24, 2014.

Legal trouble
Jones was charged with felony killing an animal by starvation on April 6, 2015. Police found a dead dog lying half inside and half outside a dog house and another dog that was starving on February 19, 2015, at a time when the air temperature was 14 degrees.

External links
Dwight Jones at ESPN.com

References

1989 births
Living people
People from Burlington, North Carolina
American football wide receivers
Players of American football from North Carolina
North Carolina Tar Heels football players
Houston Texans players
New York Jets players
Arizona Rattlers players